In Belbel is a town located in a small isolated oasis in the Sahara Desert of central Algeria, about  by air east of Adrar. As of 2009 it had a population of 962 people.

History
The town was established in the early 19th century.

In 1982 the town had a population of 464, which doubled until 2009, reaching 962. 

In the early 2000s a documentary was made in the town, Le japonais d’In Belbel, which followed the activities of a United Nations University researcher conducting field research in the area and highlighting the importance of studying such remote locations in the desert.

Geography and resources
It relies on date palm as its main agricultural resource.
During times of occasional heavy rainfall, the wadis in the vicinity display a significant variety of fauna and flora.

Education
In 2005, the town had seven teachers and 140 pupils, including girls. 15 km to the east of the town is the oasis of Matriounne which also has a small school.

References 

Populated places in Adrar Province
Oases of Algeria